Strategy of Terror is a 1969 American mystery film directed by Jack Smight, re-edited from a two-part 1965 Kraft Suspense Theatre episode, "In Darkness, Waiting".

Premise
A reporter (Barbara Rush) uncovers a plan to assassinate four United Nations (UN) representatives by a right-wing extremist (Neil Hamilton), but no one will believe her, until one New York City cop (Hugh O'Brian teams up with her to uncover the conspiracy.

Cast
 Hugh O'Brian as Matt Lacey
 Barbara Rush as Karen Lownes
 Neil Hamilton as Mr. Harkin
 Frederick O'Neal as Jacques Serac
 Will Corry as Wally Pit
 Mort Mills as Victor Pelling
 Harry Townes as Richard
 Jan Merlin as Jon

Reception
A review by Hal Erickson at AllMovie.com notes that "Frederick O'Neal, a leading light of African American theatre, is superb as a loquacious African UN delegate", and that "Neil Hamilton, onetime silent screen star and future Commissioner Gordon on TV's Batman, is surprisingly sinister as a pompous right-wing fanatic".

See also
 List of American films of 1969

References

External links

1969 films
1960s mystery films
American mystery films
Films directed by Jack Smight
Films scored by Lyn Murray
1960s English-language films
1960s American films